The National Tainan First Senior High School is a public senior high school in East District, Tainan, Taiwan. It was established in 1922 and is considered one of the most prestigious high schools in Taiwan, usually only accepting students who rank in the top 3 percentage of the Taiwan Basic Scholastic Test.

History
The school, originally called 臺南州立臺南第二中學校 ("Tainan Second High School"), was established in 1922 by the Governor-General of Taiwan to achieve a Japanese and Taiwanese 'learning together' policy. The Tainan Second High School provided high school education for ethnic Taiwanese, while Tainan First High School was for ethnic Japanese from mainland Japan.

Originally set up as a five-year high school, it was changed to a four-year school in 1943 due to the start of World War II.

After the war, Taiwan was handed to the Republic of China, whose high school system was a 3-3-year one. In 1959, ShinHua Campus was established for senior high school students in ShinHua Township, Tainan County. The campus became independent in 1966 and was renamed to National ShinHua Senior High School. In 1970, Tainan Second High School was renamed to Provincial Tainan First High School.  After Tainan was no longer included in Taiwan Province, the school became nationally funded.

Notable alumni

Academics
Wong Chi-huey, president of Academia Sinica and Wolf Prize in Chemistry laureate
Hwung-hweng Hwung, former president of National Cheng Kung University
Michael M. C. Lai, former president of National Cheng Kung University
Shang-fa Yang, plant scientist and  Wolf Prize in Agriculture laureate
Si-chen Lee, president of National Taiwan University
Chen-Yuan Lee, member of Academia Sinica

Arts and literature
 Chen-tsai Shen, famous Taiwanese painter
 Kui Yang, famous writer of Taiwanese literature
 Shih-tao Yeh, famous writer of Taiwanese literature

Film and music
Ang Lee, Academy Award-winning film director
Jutoupi, pop artist

Politics
 Shui-bian Chen, former president of the Republic of China (Taiwan) and former mayor of Taipei City
 Chih-fang Huang, former Minister of Foreign Affairs
 Chii-ming Yiin, former Minister of the Council for Economic Planning and Development (CEPD) of the Executive Yuan
 Chiu-hsing Yang, former mayor of Kaohsiung County
 I-jen Chiou, former vice president of the Executive Yuan
 Jia-dong Shea, former  Minister of Finance
 Jing-pyng Wang, president of the Legislative Yuan
 Shih-meng Chen, former Vice-President of the Central Bank of the Republic of China  and former Secretary General of  the Office of the President of the Republic of China
 Ta-chou Huang, former mayor of Taipei City
 Tan Hochen,  Minister of Transportation and Communications
 Tsan-hung Chang, former mayor of Tainan City

Sports
 Hung-chieh Chiang, table tennis player

See also
 Education in Taiwan

References

External links

Official site(Chinese)

1922 establishments in Taiwan
East District, Tainan
Educational institutions established in 1922
High schools in Taiwan
Schools in Tainan